Harkness Memorial State Park is a historic preservation area with botanical garden and recreational features located on Long Island Sound in the town of Waterford, Connecticut. The state park's  center around Eolia, a 42-room Renaissance Revival mansion with formal gardens and greenhouses. The park is managed by the Connecticut Department of Energy and Environmental Protection.

History
The park was the former summer home of philanthropists Edward and Mary Harkness, who inherited the fortune created by Edward's father, Stephen V. Harkness, who was a substantial investor in John D. Rockefeller's Standard Oil. The mansion was designed by the New York architectural firm of Lord & Hewlett and constructed in 1906–1907. From 1918 to 1929, landscape designer Beatrix Jones Farrand made extensive improvements to the grounds, adding numerous formal gardens. The estate was left to the state by Mary Harkness in 1950 and became part of the state park system in 1952. Eolia—The Harkness Estate was listed on the National Register of Historic Places in 1986 as a  historic district with 15 contributing buildings and two other contributing structures.

Activities and amenities
The park offers mansion tours, picnicking, and shoreline fishing as well as private event rentals.

See also 
 List of botanical gardens in the United States
 National Register of Historic Places listings in New London County, Connecticut

References

External links
Harkness Memorial State Park Connecticut Department of Energy and Environmental Protection
Harkness Memorial State Park Map Connecticut Department of Energy and Environmental Protection
Friends of Harkness Memorial State Park
Historic photos of Eolia interiors from the Library of Congress

State parks of Connecticut
Botanical gardens in Connecticut
Parks in New London County, Connecticut
Waterford, Connecticut
Houses on the National Register of Historic Places in Connecticut
Houses completed in 1907
Museums in New London County, Connecticut
Historic house museums in Connecticut
National Register of Historic Places in New London County, Connecticut
Houses in New London County, Connecticut
Historic districts on the National Register of Historic Places in Connecticut
Protected areas established in 1952
1952 establishments in Connecticut